Jir Mahalleh may refer to:
 Jir Mahalleh, Shaft
 Jir Mahalleh, Sowme'eh Sara